Algésiras was a  74-gun French ship of the line built at Lorient in 1804, named after the Battle of Algeciras.

In 1805 she sailed to the West Indies with  where they joined a French fleet under Vice-Admiral Villeneuve.

In October 1805 she took part in the Battle of Trafalgar, under Rear Admiral Charles Magon. Magon was killed. Algésiras finally surrendered to Tonnant at around 14:30.

During the storm after the battle, her crew rose up against the British prize crew, and recaptured the ship. She sailed to Cádiz flying French colours.

On 14 June 1808 she was captured by the Spanish along with all the other French ships in Cadiz.

See also
List of ships captured in the 19th century

References

Ships of the line of the French Navy
Téméraire-class ships of the line
1804 ships
Captured ships
Napoleonic-era ships
Ships built in France